Blackstreet (often stylized as BLACKstreet) is an American R&B group founded in 1991 by record producers Chauncey "Black" Hannibal, and Teddy "Street" Riley. The group has released four albums with Interscope Records until 2003. They achieved relative success leading up to the single "No Diggity" (featuring Dr. Dre and Queen Pen), which peaked at number 1 for four weeks in November 1996.

Formation
After the breakup of Guy, Riley (while working on Bobby Brown's 3rd album, Bobby) came up with the idea to start a new group featuring himself. Originally, the group was to be named Stonestreet, but it was later decided to combine Stonestreet with Chauncey's nickname "Black". The group became Blackstreet Featuring Teddy Riley, with an original lineup of Riley, Chauncey Hannibal, Levi Little, and Joseph Stonestreet. However, Stonestreet was replaced with Dave Hollister before the first self-titled album was released.

Career
In 1993, their first single "Baby Be Mine" was released on the soundtrack to the Universal Pictures comedy CB4 (starring Chris Rock). The song was written by Riley and Stonestreet and produced by Riley.

Their debut album, Blackstreet, featured the singles "Booti Call", "Before I Let You Go" and "Joy". "Booti Call" and "Before I Let You Go" were both Top 40 hits, with "Before I Let You Go" hitting the Top 10. In 1996, they released their second album Another Level. It was a breakthrough success due to the top single "No Diggity" (with Dr. Dre), which was a No. 1 hit on the Billboard Hot 100 in November 1996. In 1998, Blackstreet won the Grammy Award for Best R&B Performance by a Duo or Group with Vocals.

Another Level eventually went four times platinum in the United States and peaked at No. 3 on the Billboard chart. "No Diggity" was later ranked at No. 91 on Rolling Stone and MTV: 100 Greatest Pop Songs. Another Level featured Mark Middleton and Eric Williams in place of Dave Hollister and Levi Little. Both Middleton and Williams were in groups prior to joining Blackstreet. Middleton was part of the short-lived Motown Records group Brik Citi. Williams was part of the trio The Flex, a group that sang on songs produced by their mentor Marley Marl. The success of Another Level landed them a guest appearance on Jay-Z's "The City Is Mine" and they teamed with Mýa and Mase for the hit "Take Me There" from the Rugrats soundtrack. The success of Another Level would also land them a spot on New Edition's 1997 Home Again reunion tour.

Blackstreet had a top ten album with Finally. The first single from the album, "Girlfriend/Boyfriend", was a collaboration with Janet Jackson featuring Ja Rule and Eve. Riley recorded a reunion album with Guy in 2000 and subsequently began working on material for his first solo record. Riley had second thoughts about disbanding Blackstreet and patched things up with Hannibal. Middleton and Williams returned to restore the Another Level lineup, and Riley's solo project became a Blackstreet reunion. After rumors of legal action and a preemptive countersuit, the group re-banded and released Level II.

After several failed attempts to keep Blackstreet together, all members eventually continued with solo careers for a time. However, in 2014 it was announced that past members Black, Little, Middleton, and Williams were back together under the Blackstreet moniker. They continued to perform with this lineup currently, and embarked on their second Australian tour in April 2015.

In 2015, three ex-members, Mark Middleton, Eric Williams and Jeremy Hanna were backing vocals for Eurovision Song Contest 2015 North Macedonia entry "Autumn Leaves" performed by Daniel Kajmakoski.

Members
Current
Chauncey "Black" Hannibal
Levi Little
Mark Middleton
Eric Williams

Blackstreet featuring Teddy Riley
Teddy Riley
Dave Hollister
Sherman Tisdale "J-Stylz"
Rodney Poe

Past members
Joseph Stonestreet (Original member only appeared on single "Baby Be Mine")
Terrell Phillips (Appeared on the album Finally)
Kermit Quinn (performed during live shows, does not appear on album)
Lenny Harold
Sherman Tisdale
Tony Tyler

Discography

Blackstreet (1994)
Another Level (1996)
Finally (1999)
Level II (2003)

References

Grammy Award winners
Interscope Records artists
American soul musical groups
African-American musical groups
New jack swing music groups
Musical groups established in 1991
1991 establishments in New York City
American contemporary R&B musical groups
MTV Europe Music Award winners